Justice: Qalb Al Adala is a 2017 Arabic-language television series created by William Finklestein and Walter Parkes and starring Mansoor Alfeeli, Khalifa al Bhri and Fatima Al Taei. The plot revolves around Farah (Fatima Al Taei), a law student who studied in the United States, who returns to her hometown of Abu Dhabi to practice her profession. Her father Hasan (Mansoor Al Feeli) wants her to work for the family's firm, but Farah is determined to open her own practice.

Cast
 Mansoor Al Feeli as Mr. Hassan
 Khalifa al Bhri as Rashid
 Fatima Al Taei as Farah
 Neven Madi as Leila
 Mohamed Al-Amiri as Khaled

Release
Justice: Qalb Al Adala was released on September 17, 2017 on OSN Ya Hala Al Oula.

References

External links
 

2010s drama television series
Arabic-language television shows